Leucos albus is a species of freshwater fish in the family Cyprinidae. Zeta and Morača river systems and Lake Skadar in Montenegro.

References

Leucos
Fish described in 2010
Cyprinid fish of Europe